Nicu Romică Şerban (born 18 January 1970) is a Romanian sprint canoer who competed from the early 1990s to the mid-2000s (decade). He won seven medals at the ICF Canoe Sprint World Championships with five silvers (K-2 200 m: 1994, 1995, 2003; K-4 500 m: 2001, 2003) and two bronzes (K-2 200 m: 1998, K-4 1000 m: 1999).

Şerban also competed in three Summer Olympics, earning his best finish of seventh in the K-4 1000 m event at Barcelona in 1992.

References 

Sports-reference.com profile

1970 births
Canoeists at the 1992 Summer Olympics
Canoeists at the 1996 Summer Olympics
Canoeists at the 2000 Summer Olympics
Living people
Olympic canoeists of Romania
Romanian male canoeists
ICF Canoe Sprint World Championships medalists in kayak